Rob Eden (1892 - 1947) was the nom de plume of American fiction writer Robert Ferdiand Burkhardt and his wife Eve. Several of his stories were adapted to film in the 1930s. Burkhardt worked at various newspapers before working as a publicist in Hollywood. He also wrote mysteries using the pseudonyms Adam Bliss and Rex Jardin.

Burkhardt was born in Altoona, Iowa.

Bibliography
Second Chance (1932)
Dancing Feet
In Love With a T-Man
Love or Money
Modern Marriage 
Short Skirts: A Story of Modern Youth
Always in Her Heart
Blond Trouble
Fickle
The Girl With Red Hair
Golden Goddess
Heartbreak Girl
Her Dream Prince
Her Fondest Hope
In Love With a T-Man
Jennifer Hale
Kathie the First
Loot (1932), actress Louise Brooks featured on the cover
Love Blind
Love Came Late
Love Comes Flying
Love Wings
The Lovely Liar
Lucky Lady
Men at Her Feet (1933)
Moon Over the Water
The Mountain Lodge
A New Friend
Pay Check
Step-Child
This Man Is Yours
Trapped By Love
$20 a Week
Honeymoon Delayed

As Adam Bliss

The Camden Ruby Murders
Four Times a Widower
Murder Upstairs

Filmography
Twenty Dollars a Week (1935)
Dancing Feet (1936)
Jennifer Hale (1937)
I Demand Payment (1938), based on Second Choice

References

External links 

 

1892 births
1947 deaths